The Long Beach Chiefs were an American basketball team based in Honolulu, Hawaii (1961–62) and Long Beach, California (1962–63) that was a member of the American Basketball League.

History
The American Basketball League played one full season, 1961–1962, and part of the next season until the league folded on December 31, 1962. The ABL was the first basketball league to have a three point shot for baskets scored far away from the goal. Other rules that set the league apart were a 30-second shooting clock and a wider free throw lane, 18 feet instead of the standard 12.

The American Basketball League was formed when Abe Saperstein did not get the Los Angeles National Basketball Association (NBA) franchise he sought. His Harlem Globetrotters had strong NBA ties.  When Minneapolis Lakers owner Bob Short was permitted to move the Lakers to Los Angeles, Saperstein reacted by convincing National Alliance of Basketball Leagues (NABL) team owner Paul Cohen (Tuck Tapers) and Amateur Athletic Union (AAU) National Champion Cleveland Pipers owner George Steinbrenner to take the top NABL and AAU teams and players and form a rival league.

League franchises were the Chicago Majors (1961–1963); Cleveland Pipers (1961–1962); Kansas City Steers (1961–63); Long Beach Chiefs (1961–1963), as Hawaii Chiefs in 1961–62; Los Angeles Jets (1961–62, disbanded during season); Oakland Oaks 1961–1963, as San Francisco Saints in 1961–1962; Philadelphia Tapers 1961–1963, as Washington Tapers in 1961–62; moved to New York during 1961–62 season; as New York Tapers in 1961–62 and the Pittsburgh Rens (1961–1963).

The team was known as the Hawaii Chiefs from 1961–62.

The Chiefs were owned by Art Kim who was later the owner of the Anaheim Amigos of the American Basketball Association.

They finished 13–28 (1961–1962) and 16–8 (1962–1963) under coaches Red Rocha and Al Brightman. They started 10–0 in 1962–1963.

The Arenas
The Chiefs played at the Long Beach Arena. The arena is still in use by Long Beach State University athletics. The location is 300 E Ocean Blvd, Long Beach, CA 90802.

In Honolulu they rotated between the Civic Auditorium, the Conroy Bowl at Schofield Barracks
and Bloch Arena. The Civic Auditorium in Honolulu was demolished in 1973. It was located on South King Street. It was replaced by an American Security Bank Building, now the Interstate Building.

Conroy Bowl is now a medical facility on Schofield Barracks. The address is 627–699 Trimble Road, Wahiawa, HI 96786.

Bloch Arena in Pearl Harbor is still in use today and also hosted the collegiate Pearl Harbour Basketball Invitational. The address is 224 A Avenue, Honolulu, HI 96818.

Notable alumni
 Bob Anderegg
 Frank Burgess
 Jeff Cohen
 Rick Herrscher
 Bill Spivey
 Govoner Vaughn

Year by year

References 

American Basketball League (1961–62) teams
Sports in Long Beach, California
Basketball teams in Hawaii
Sports in Honolulu
Basketball teams in Los Angeles
Defunct basketball teams in California
1963 disestablishments in California